The Merizo Conbento is a historic building on Guam Route 4 in Merizo, Guam.  Built in 1856, it is the oldest known occupied building on the island.  It is a two-story concrete and ifil-wood structure with a gabled corrugated-metal roof, and a large set of concrete stairs leading to the main level above a raised basement.  The present-day exterior is a faithful representation of the building's original appearance (with the exception of the roofing material, and original walls of manposteria (coral mixed with lime) remain inside the structure.  It was built as a parish house for the local Roman Catholic diocese, and saw use as a military post and prison during the Japanese occupation period during World War II.

The building was listed on the National Register of Historic Places in 1974.

See also
National Register of Historic Places listings in Guam

References

Buildings and structures on the National Register of Historic Places in Guam
Buildings and structures completed in 1856
Buildings and structures in Guam